Andrzej Możdżeń (born 7 July 1962) is a Polish boxer. He competed in the men's light welterweight event at the 1988 Summer Olympics.

References

1962 births
Living people
Polish male boxers
Olympic boxers of Poland
Boxers at the 1988 Summer Olympics
People from Morąg
Sportspeople from Warmian-Masurian Voivodeship
Light-welterweight boxers